The Grand Avenue Bridge was located in Neillsville, Wisconsin. It was added to the National Register of Historic Places in 1984, but it was later demolished and it was removed from the register in 1987.

See also
List of bridges documented by the Historic American Engineering Record in Wisconsin

References

Road bridges on the National Register of Historic Places in Wisconsin
Historic American Engineering Record in Wisconsin
National Register of Historic Places in Clark County, Wisconsin
Truss arch bridges in the United States
Transportation in Clark County, Wisconsin
Pratt truss bridges in the United States
Wrought iron bridges in the United States
Bridges completed in 1894
Buildings and structures demolished in 1985
Former National Register of Historic Places in Wisconsin